The Walnut Ridge Army Airfield Access Road is a historic roadway segment near College City, Arkansas. It has a largely original concrete surface , with gravel shoulders. It also passes over two period culverts. The roadway is part of the original main access road to the Walnut Ridge Army Airfield, and was built in 1942–43, when the field was in active use during World War II. It is a well-preserved example of the period road building.

The roadway section was listed on the National Register of Historic Places in 2016.

See also
National Register of Historic Places listings in Lawrence County, Arkansas

References

Roads on the National Register of Historic Places in Arkansas
Buildings and structures completed in 1942
Transportation in Lawrence County, Arkansas
National Register of Historic Places in Lawrence County, Arkansas